The Wollaston Lake Barge Ferry is a barge ferry that operates in the Canadian province of Saskatchewan in the Northern Saskatchewan Administration District of the province. The ferry crosses Wollaston Lake, providing a link between Highway 905 and the community of Wollaston Lake, Saskatchewan.

The barge is operated by the Hatchet Lake Dene Nation under contract to the Government of Saskatchewan. The barge has tolls and operates twice per day during the ice-free season while an ice-road is used during part of the winter. Passage must be pre-booked.

It is the only non-cable ferry in the province.

See also
Transportation in Saskatchewan

References

Ferries of Saskatchewan
Division No. 18, Saskatchewan